The Southern Region was a region of British Railways from 1948 until 1992 when railways were re-privatised. The region ceased to be an operating unit in its own right in the 1980s. The region covered south London, southern England and the south coast, including the busy commuter belt areas of Kent, Sussex and Surrey. The region was largely based upon the former Southern Railway area.

The Region 

The Southern Railway was still comparatively profit-making despite World War II, thanks to its extensive third rail DC electrification and the intensive service patterns this allowed for. However, large-scale investment was required in the infrastructure of all of the "Big 4" companies, including the Southern.

The Transport Act 1947 provided for the nationalisation of all heavy rail systems in the UK to allow for this investment and, in theory, to improve the rights of railway workers. The railway companies were amalgamated into British Railways, part of the British Transport Commission, and six geographic and administrative regions were created out of the previous four companies. The Southern Railway, being relatively self-contained and operated largely by electric traction, was incorporated almost intact as the new Southern Region. The acting General Manager of the Southern Railway, John Elliot became the first Chief Regional Officer of the Southern Region.

The Southern Region also inherited some independent light railways, namely the East Kent Light Railway, the Kent and East Sussex Railway and the North Devon and Cornwall Junction Light Railway.

The Southern Region served southern London, Kent, Surrey, Sussex, Hampshire, the Isle of Wight, and some areas of Dorset, Wiltshire and Berkshire. There was also an unelectrified service to parts of Devon and Cornwall, deep in what was largely Western Region territory, known colloquially as "The Withered Arm". The Southern Region also assumed operating responsibility for the Somerset & Dorset Joint Railway (although the provision of motive power fell to the London Midland Region).  There were three operating divisions: Eastern, Central and Western which correspond approximately to the three current franchise areas.

London 
The Region's chief stations in Central London were:
Waterloo, the largest terminal in London
Victoria
Charing Cross
Blackfriars
Cannon Street
Holborn Viaduct (later replaced by City Thameslink)
London Bridge

Other major stations in London included:
, which has long claimed to be Britain's busiest railway station and one of the busiest in Europe
Wimbledon and Richmond in south west London
Balham, Lewisham and New Cross Gate in the south east
East Croydon in the southern area

Outside London 
Outside Greater London the main stations were:
 in Wiltshire
 in Devon
 (the SR platforms relocated from Reading Southern to Reading General) and Windsor and Eton Riverside in Berkshire

Southern and Western Regions had important interchanges at Reading and Exeter St Davids.

Line and station closures 
Underused stations such as those between East Grinstead and Lewes (a few of them later reopened with the Bluebell Railway), and most of the Isle of Wight's lines were closed in the 1950s.

The Beeching Axe severely cut route mileages of most regions but the Southern escaped major losses in the London area due to high passenger numbers on its frequent suburban services. The Axe did, however, close some country routes including the Cuckoo Line, the Cranleigh Line, the Steyning Line, the New Romney branch line and the Bexhill West Branch Line, plus goods yards including Deptford Wharf and Falcon Lane.

The lines in Devon and Cornwall were reclassified to the Western Region and the Southern's luxury trains, including the Atlantic Coast Express and the Brighton Belle, ceased in the 1960s and 70s.
 
The Snow Hill tunnel between Blackfriars and Farringdon closed in the 1960s, then later reopened as part of the earliest proposals of the Thameslink Programme. At the same time, Holborn Viaduct in central London closed in 1990, replaced with City Thameslink occupying the same site at an underground level. In the late 1990s, the  Addiscombe Line and the West Croydon to Wimbledon Line in south London were closed as these routes were replaced by the Croydon Tramlink.

As a contrast, London Waterloo had been extensively refurbished and expanded to allow development of the Eurostar's Waterloo International railway station terminal. These platforms were closed after international services moved to St Pancras International in 2007. They were reopened respectively in 2017 and 2018 to increase capacity for suburban services.

Channel Tunnel planning 
The 1973 plan to build a tunnel under the English Channel also included plans to upgrade the infrastructure of the Southern Region between London and the Kent coast.

The plan assumed that the main railhead for "The Chunnel" would be at Ashford Kent station. To that end, rolling stock on the London to Dover via Ashford services was refurbished and heavier rails were laid to allow for longer trains and increased freight.

The 1973 tunnel plan was cancelled in 1975. The 1986 tunnel plan, which was approved and eventually built, used the same assumptions as the 1973 plan and Ashford Kent became Ashford International. By this time the Southern Region had been abolished.

Until 1980 the Southern Region operated the Night Ferry sleeper train (jointly with SNCF) from London Victoria to Paris and Brussels.

Competition with London Transport 
The Southern Railway and its predecessor companies have had little competition from London Transport south of the River Thames, where the subsoil was largely unsuitable for tunnelling and the mainline railways had extensive networks in place before the underground railways were developed.

London Underground's services were advanced over Southern Region (and other) tracks, either through dual-running or by ceding BR tracks to LUL. The LUL service to Wimbledon for instance slowly replaced the former Southern Region service. Tramlink, however, took over the West Croydon to Wimbledon Line in 2000.

The Waterloo & City line (nicknamed 'The Drain' by both staff and users), British Rail's only "Tube" service, was given over to London Underground upon the Privatisation of British Rail in 1994.

Further Electrification 

The Southern Railway had adopted a plan to convert all lines east of Portsmouth to third rail electric traction in November 1946, to be completed by 1955. This plan would have included several branch and secondary lines that were subsequently closed such as the Bluebell and Steyning lines and also those secondary and branch lines in the area which were later dieselized such as the Marshlink and Oxted-Uckfield lines. This plan was, however, overtaken by the Transport Act 1947 which brought about the creation of British Railways.

Kent Coast 
The first new scheme to be adopted by the Southern Region was implemented in two Phases.
Phase 1: electrifying the former London Chatham and Dover routes between Gillingham, Ramsgate and Dover.
Phase 2: reopening the former South Eastern Railway lines in Kent.

Isle of Wight 
Owing to restricted clearances existing electric stock could not be used on the railways of the Isle of Wight. The surviving line between Ryde and Shanklin was therefore electrified in March 1967 using converted stock originally built for London Electric Railway in 1921.  These became British Rail Classes 485 and 486. During the mid 1980s these were replaced by Class 483, which were also rebuilt from former London Underground stock.

South West Main Line 
The first phase of South West Main Line (beyond the London suburbs) was electrified in 1967 and included the services from London Waterloo station to Southampton and Bournemouth. Electrification was extended all the way to Weymouth in 1988.

Hastings 
Existing electric stock could not be used on the line between Tonbridge and Hastings because of restricted clearances in four tunnels along the route. In 1986, the Hastings Line was electrified with single tracks through tunnels, enabling the use of generic rolling stock.

Oxted and East Grinstead
The former London, Brighton and South Coast Railway and the South Eastern Railway  joint line between Croydon and Oxted, and the LB&SCR line to East Grinstead was electrified in 1987. But the branch line to Uckfield remains operated by diesel multiple units.

Franchising 
The Southern Region was abolished in 1992 because British Rail had decided to move from regional management to business sectors. The Region was divided between two of the new passenger businesses: Network SouthEast and InterCity.

When the British Rail passenger services were privatised in the 1990s the lines of the former region were divided between South West Trains, Thameslink, Island Line, Thames Trains, Gatwick Express, Connex South Central and Connex South Eastern.

In 2002 the South Central franchise was awarded to Govia and rebranded it "Southern". Next, the government took back control of the Connex South Eastern franchise and operated it as South Eastern Trains until it was franchised to Govia again as Southeastern in 2006.

As part of a general reorganisation of franchises, Island Line (on the Isle of Wight) was merged with South West Trains in 2005 to form the South Western franchise. Thameslink became part of First Capital Connect in 2006, and Gatwick Express was merged with Southern in 2007. The North Downs Line was taken over by First Great Western, which in 2014 was renamed Great Western Railway. In the early years of its franchise, South West Trains reinstated 'West of England line' services beyond Exeter to Plymouth and Paignton, but these were cut back again (after only two years of operation) in order to strengthen its core service to Exeter.

Also in 2014, Govia had been selected to operate the new Thameslink Southern & Great Northern franchise (TSGN), including the South Central franchise Govia were already operating. On 26 July 2015 the South Central franchise ended and its services were incorporated into TSGN franchise; Govia announced that they would continue to use the Southern and Gatwick Express brands.

In August 2017, South Western Railway commenced operations in the South Western franchise.

Trains and rolling stock 

At the time of its creation the Southern Region still had large numbers of steam locomotives The Southern Region also owned three locomotive works at Ashford, Brighton, and Eastleigh, two carriage works (Eastleigh and Lancing) and a wagon works at Ashford. Most of these closed before privatisation.

Unlike the other regions of British Railways, the Southern Region did not rush to withdraw its steam locomotives, instead using them right up to the completion of large-scale electrification. Consequently, the Southern Region was the last region in Britain to regularly use steam on high speed expresses and to have steam operated branch lines. Steam traction over the region finally ended in July 1967, to be replaced by a combination of multiple units and locomotives.

The region had ordered large fleets of slam-door electric multiple unit rolling stock with Mark 1 bodies in the 1950s and 1960s, but some Southern Railway-style units survived until the mid-1990s. By that time, much of the Region's slam door fleet reached the end of its design life of 35–40 years and was replaced by more reliable sliding- and plug-door stock - much of it after privatisation (mainly using Electrostar and Desiro trains) - although BR started to replace inner suburban trains from the 1970s.

A fleet of diesel-electric multiple units, also known by enthusiasts as "Thumpers" because of their distinctive engines, ran on non- or partly-electrified routes. These include the Oxted line, the Hastings line and the North Downs line.

Isle of Wight railway lines used elderly steam engines cascaded from the mainland for many years, but in 1966 the Southern Region acquired some redundant "Standard" tube stock from London Transport that varied build dates between 1923 and 1934. Most of the lines in the island had been closed in the 1950s and early 1960s, but the remaining route from Ryde to Shanklin was electrified to normal Southern Region third rail specification, and the "Standard" tube stock was converted (from LT's fourth rail to third) so that it could be run on it. In the late-1980s these trains were replaced by more redundant LT tube stock, this time dating from 1938.

Few Mark 2 multiple units were built but some driving trailers were introduced for Gatwick Airport express services, then operated by the InterCity brand.

British Rail built a fleet of electric units to operate Bournemouth services from Waterloo in the 1980s, with Mark 3 bodies and plug doors. These Class 442 (5-WES) units later transferred to the Brighton Main Line in 2008 on Gatwick Express services from Victoria, ran by the Southern franchise, before returning to South Western Railway in 2019.

The last slam door units ran in mainline operations in November 2005. New safety regulations prohibiting the use of trains with slam doors (unless equipped with secondary or central locking) were not introduced until the last examples could be withdrawn. Exceptionally, some slam door units were allowed to stay in service for another couple of years by special derogation on the Lymington Pier "heritage" branch before they retired permanently in 2010. Some Mark 1 units have been preserved by heritage railways ever since.

Major accidents 

A lack of investment and focus on infrastructure maintenance and collision safeguards across institutions led to a marginal improvement in the net rate of fatal incidents compared to the same (non-British Rail) period before nationalisation, which reduced potential passengers' confidence.

The British railway industry failed to keep track with the safety regime of its aviation industry, which by the 2000s became its national precedent and contributed to a swift decline in fatalities.

2 December 1955: 11 passengers died and 41 were injured when an electric passenger train from Waterloo to Windsor and Chertsey (dividing at Staines) collided with the rear of a goods train. The accident occurred in thick fog and was caused by irregular block instrument operation by the signalman at Barnes Junction.
4 December 1957: 90 passengers died and 173 were injured in a collision in thick fog near Lewisham in south London, which also caused the collapse of an overhead rail bridge on to the wreckage below. The number of deaths was the third highest ever in a British railway accident. 
5 November 1967: 49 people died and 78 were injured when a train from Hastings to Charing Cross was derailed by a track defect outside Hither Green station. Amongst the survivors was Robin Gibb of the Bee Gees.
12 December 1988: 35 people died and 100 were injured when three trains collided near Clapham Junction because a signal circuit had been wrongly wired.
4 March 1989: 6 people died and 94 were injured when two trains collided at Purley when one passed a red signal.

Later heritage lines
As to lines closed during the time the region existed, some are preserved railways, mainly the Watercress Line, Bluebell Railway, Spa Valley Railway, Isle of Wight Steam Railway, Swanage Railway and Dartmoor Railway.

References 

 Ball, MG. British Railways Atlas Ian Allan Publishing 2004.
 London Railway Atlas Railway Clearing House, London 1935
 Dudley, G. Why Does Policy Change? - Lessons from British Transport Policy 1945-99 Routledge 2001
 
Hoyle,R The Atmospheric Southern Corhampton Kevin Robertson 2007 
 Moody, G.T. Southern Electric 4th edition; Ian Allan Publishing 1968 

British Rail regions
750 V DC railway electrification